The Svalbard Rocket Range or SvalRak as it is named, is a launch site for sounding rockets at Ny-Ålesund in Svalbard, Norway. The site has been in use since 1997 and is owned by Andøya Space Center, which is owned by the Norwegian Ministry of Trade, Industry and Fisheries and the Kongsberg Group. SvalRak's location at the 79th parallel north makes it well-suited for launching rockets to investigate Earth's magnetic field. It is used mostly by American, Japanese and Norwegian researchers. It is the world's northernmost launch site.

History 

Planning of a launch site in Ny-Ålesund started in 1993, a location chosen because of its ideal location to study the polar cusp. Construction of the site started in the summer of 1997. The Norwegian Institute for Air Research, which conducts air measurements in Ny-Ålesund, was concerned that the rockets could pollute their measurements. A test rocket was launched on 15 November. The first proper launch was an Indian Rohini RH-300 MkII sounding rocket purchased from ISRO and christened Isbjørn 1 (Polar Bear 1). This rocket contained instruments from University Centre in Svalbard, the University of Tromsø and the Norwegian Defence Research Establishment.

SvalRak originally held permission to fire four rockets every two years. The site was upgraded in 2018.

Use 

SvalRak is the world's northernmost rocket launch site, and is located at the 79th parallel north. This makes it an ideal location for sending instruments into Earth's magnetic field and the polar cups, cleft and cup. It is also used for studying the Magnetopause and aurora borealis, for which Ny-Ålesund is the most convenient location because of its ease of access. It is owned by Andøya Space Center, which is owned by the Norwegian Ministry of Trade, Industry and Fisheries (90 percent) and the Kongsberg Group (10 percent). SvalRak has no permanent staff in Ny-Ålesund. The main users are American, Japanese and to a less extent Norwegian scientists.

References 

Rocket launch sites in Norway
Norwegian Space Centre
Kongsberg Gruppen
Ny-Ålesund
1997 establishments in Norway
Science and technology in Svalbard